The 1998–99 Washington Capitals season was the Washington Capitals 25th season in the National Hockey League (NHL). The Capitals missed the playoffs, despite their amazing run to the 1998 Stanley Cup Finals the previous year.

Off-season

Regular season
The Caps opened the 1998-1999 season by raising their "Eastern Conference Champions 1997-1998" banner to the rafters of the MCI Center then shutting out the Mighty Ducks of Anaheim 1-0 with Olaf Kolzig making 29 saves.

On January 16, 1999, Kelly Miller scored just nine seconds into the overtime period to give the Caps a 3–2 road win over the Carolina Hurricanes. It would prove to be the fastest overtime goal scored during the 1998–99 regular season.

On February 3, 1999, the Caps defeated the Tampa Bay Lightning at home by a score of 10–1. Peter Bondra scored four goals in the game. It was the first time that Washington had scored ten goals in a regular-season game since December 17, 1993, when they defeated the Ottawa Senators at home by a score of 11–2.

On March 23, 1999 the Caps traded captain Dale Hunter, Joe Juneau (who had scored the OT goal that led the Caps to the 1998 Stanley Cup Final), and Craig Berube.

A month after the season finale owner Abe Pollin announced he had sold the team to Ted Leonsis

The Caps were shut out an NHL-high 11 times. They also tied the St. Louis Blues for the fewest power-play opportunities, with just 301. The Caps failed to make the playoffs after playing in the 1998 Stanley Cup Final. They led the NHL in man-games lost to injury with 511.

Final standings

Schedule and results

Player statistics

Regular season
Scoring

Goaltending

Awards and records

Transactions

Draft picks
Washington's draft picks at the 1998 NHL Entry Draft held at the Marine Midland Arena in Buffalo, New York.

See also
 1998–99 NHL season

References
Bibliography
 
 

W
W
Washington Capitals seasons
Cap
Cap